Dehnow-e Aliabad (also Romanized as Dehnow-e ‘Alīābād and Deh Now ‘Alīābād; also known as Deh Now) is a village in Almahdi Rural District, Jowkar District, Malayer County, Hamadan Province, Iran. At the 2006 census, its population was 1,417, in 334 families.

References 

Populated places in Malayer County